Puñihuil is a cove with a small community on the northwestern coast of the Isla Grande de Chiloe, which lies near the coast of Northern Patagonia in Chile.

The Islotes de Puñihuil Natural Monument, three small islands, lie to the west and north of the cove.
The monument is the only known shared breeding site for Humboldt and Magellanic penguins.
It is also a breeding area for other species including the red-legged cormorant and kelp gull.
The Alfaguara project, a marine life conservation project operates from Puñihuil.
The focus of the project is on preservation of endangered blue whales, for which the waters to the northwest are an important feeding area.

Gallery

References

Landforms of Los Lagos Region
Bays of Chile
Coves
Marine conservation